Sean Patrick Francis Hughes (born 2 December 1941) is emeritus professor of orthopaedic surgery at Imperial College London where he was previously professor of orthopaedic surgery and head of the department of surgery, anaesthetics and intensive care. Earlier in his career he had been professor of orthopaedic surgery at the University of Edinburgh.

His clinical research topics have included fracture healing, musculoskeletal infection and the surgery of degenerate  lumbar and cervical discs. His basic science research publications include studies of the microcirculation of bone, bone infection and the role of nitric oxide in bone and joint disease. He served as vice president of the Royal College of Surgeons of Edinburgh, and chairman of DISCS, the charity funding research into spinal conditions.

His interests in the history of medicine have focused on the history of orthopaedic surgery, and the doctor and poet John Keats.

Early life and training
Hughes was born in Farnham, Surrey, England, son of Patrick J. and Kathleen E. Hughes. He completed his early education at Downside School. He studied medicine at the University of London, qualifying MB BS in 1966. His surgical training in orthopaedics took place in London and he became a senior registrar in orthopaedic and trauma surgery at the Middlesex Hospital and the Royal National Orthopaedic Hospital. He attained his FRCSEd in 1971 and FRCSEng and FRCSI the following year. Subsequently, he was awarded the degree of MS from University of London with a thesis on bone scanning, completed while he was research fellow at the Mayo Clinic, Rochester, Minnesota, US.

Surgical career
In 1979 he was appointed Senior Lecturer and honorary consultant orthopaedic surgeon, Royal Postgraduate Medical School in London. Later that year he was appointed to the Chair of Orthopaedic Surgery at the University of Edinburgh. In 1984/85, he held an academic mentorship for Rüdiger Döhler.

The International Skeletal Society's 25th anniversary book lists him as a member.

In 1991, he became Professor of orthopaedic surgery, Imperial College London and honorary consultant orthopaedic surgeon, Hammersmith Hospitals NHS Trust (1991–2006). At the same time he took on the role of Chief of Service Orthopaedics and Trauma Surgery, Hammersmith Hospitals NHS Trust, a post which he held until 1998, when he became the Trust's Clinical Director for Surgery and Anaesthetics. He was Non-Executive Director of the West Middlesex University Hospital (2001–2005) and was Medical Director of Ravenscourt Park Hospital from 2002–2004. Hughes was Clinical Director of the Hillingdon Primary Care Trust from 2008–10.

In addition to his clinical and academic responsibilities, he was Vice President of the Royal College of Surgeons of Edinburgh (1994–97) and President of the British Orthopaedic Research Society (1995–97). He served as chairman of the charity Action Research, now called Action Medical Research (1998–1991).

He was on the International Advisory Board of the Journal of Orthopaedics, Trauma
and was Chairman of the charity Discovering Innovative Solutions for Conditions of the Spine (DISCS).

Currently (2018) he is a primary editor of The Bone & Joint Journal.

Hughes performed basic research on bone blood flow mineral exchange, musculoskeletal infections and stem cell research. He has a special interest in degenerative disc disease and external fixation of fractures (Hughes-Suhktian fixator).

History of Medicine
Hughes has lectured on the history of orthopaedics. In addition, he gave the eponymous Keats lecture at the Worshipful Society of Apothecaries in 2017.

Personal life
Hughes married Felicity Mary Anderson and they had two daughters and one son. Their eldest daughter was the journalist Sarah Hughes.

Awards and honours
Arris and Gale Lecturer, Royal College of Surgeons, 1976.
Seddon Prize, Royal National Orthopaedic Hospital, 1976.
U.K. Travelling Fellow, British Orthopaedic Association, 1977
A.B.C. Travelling Fellow, British Orthopaedic Association, 1978
Scandinavian Travelling Fellow, British and Scandinavian Orthopaedic Association, 1986
Visiting Clinical Scientist, Mayo Clinic, Rochester, USA, 1989
Rahima Dawood Travelling Professor, East African Associations of Surgeons, 1992
Patrick Kelly Visiting Professor, Mayo Clinic, USA, 2000
Walter Mercer Lecturer, British Orthopaedic Association, 2004
President's Medal from the British Orthopaedic Research Society, September 2017.

Selected publications
Hughes wrote or contributed to 216 total publications in scientific journals, thirty-two chapters in books and thirteen books.

Papers

General orthopaedics
 
"Fluid space in bone". Clinical Orthopaedics and Related Research. Vol. 134, 1 July 1978, pp. 32–341. Co-authored with D.R. Davies, P.J. Kelly and R. Khan, 
 
"Orthopaedics. The principles and practice of musculoskeletal surgery". British Journal of Surgery. Vol. 75, 1988, pp. 623–623. Co-authored with M. K. D’A. Benson and C. L. Colton.

Bone blood flow and fracture healing

Infection

Intervertebral disc
 
"The Cervical Disc". Bailliere's Clinical Orthopaedics – International Practice and Research. Vol. 2, Number 2, August 1997.
"The pathogenesis of degeneration of the intervertebral disc and emerging therapies in the management of back pain". The Bone & Joint Journal, Vol. 94-B, No. 10 (2012), pp. 1298-1304. . Co-authored with A. J. Freemont, D. W. Hukins, A. H. McGregor and S. Roberts.

Humanities

Books
Bone Circulation and Vascularization in Normal and Pathological Conditions. Springer, NATO Science Series: A (1993). . Co-authored with A. Schoutens, J. Arlet and J.W.M. Gardeniers, 
Musculoskeletal Infections. Yearbook Medical Publishers (1986). Co-authored with R. H. Fitzgerald. 
Textbook of Orthopaedics and Fractures. Taylor & Francis(1997). . Co-authored with R. W. Porter
Nitric Oxide in Bone and Joint. Cambridge University Press (2008). Co-authored with Mika V. J. Hukkanen, Julia M. Polak.

Book chapters
"Fibröse Knochendysplasie und Weil-Albright-Syndrom", co-authored with J.R. Döhler in Walter Blauth and Hans-Wolfram Ulrich's Spätergebnisse in der Orthopädie, Springer-Verlag (1986), .
 “The Regulation of Blood Flow in Bone”, co-authored with Corbett SA, Reichert ILH, McCarthy ID, Osteonecrosis (Urbaniak JR, Jones JP), American Academy of Orthopaedic Surgeons, 1997, Chapter 2, pp. 11–19.
"The Use of Mesenchymal Stem Cells for Bone and Cartilage Repair", co-authored with R. Behan, N. A. Habib, M. Y. Gordon and N. Levičar. Stem Cell Repair And Regeneration, Imperial College Press, London (2008). .

Book reviews
Clinical Disorders of the Shoulder. Lipmann Kessel (Pp 182) Churchill Livingstone (1982). British Medical Journal Vol. 284, 3 April 1982, p. 1036
The First Transplant Surgeon: The Flawed Genius of Nobel Prize Winner, Alexis Carrel by David Hamilton, British Society for the History of Medicine Book Reviews, January 2017.

References

External links

U.S. National Library of Medicine
Stem Cells and Tibial Fractures
Discs Foundation (with photographic portrait)

1941 births
Academics of the University of Edinburgh
Alumni of the University of London
English surgeons
Academics of Imperial College London
Living people
Fellows of the Royal College of Surgeons
Fellows of the Royal College of Surgeons of Edinburgh
British orthopaedic surgeons
Presidents of the History of Medicine Society